This is a list of British television-related events in 1976.

Events

January
 2 January – Sheffield Cablevision closes when its funds run out.
 5 January – BBC1 begin showing the children's animated series Paddington, based on the books by Michael Bond and narrated by Michael Hordern.
 6 January – The children's supernatural comedy series Rentaghost debuts on BBC1.
 7 January – Debut of the Michael Palin and Terry Jones comedy anthology series Ripping Yarns on BBC2.

February
4 February – Early morning programming from the Open University begins on BBC1 with Electrons in motion airing at 7:05am. It would only be shown on UHF 625-line transmitters.
 20 February – The first regular episode of the Ronnie Barker and David Jason starring comedy series Open All Hours airs on BBC2, almost three years after the pilot episode was first shown.

March
No events.

April
3 April – The 21st Eurovision Song Contest is won by Brotherhood of Man, representing the United Kingdom, with their song Save Your Kisses for Me.
5 April – Patricia Phoenix returns to the role of Elsie Tanner on Coronation Street after an absence of three years.
6 April – The original scheduled airdate of Dennis Potter's Play for Today Brimstone and Treacle. The film is pulled from transmission on BBC1 due to controversy over its content, including the rape of a woman by the devil. It is eventually shown on that channel in 1987, after having been made into a film starring Sting in 1982.
7 April – Margot Bryant makes her last appearance as Minnie Caldwell on Coronation Street.
23 April – BBC1 debuts the US police action series Starsky & Hutch, starring David Soul and Paul Michael Glaser with the feature length pilot episode.

May
2 May – The network television premiere of the 1963 James Bond film From Russia with Love on ITV, starring Sean Connery.
May – London Weekend Television is reorganised, to form a new company "LWT (Holdings) Limited". which allowed the company to expand into a number of new ventures, including Hutchinson Publishing.

June
 18 June – New Broadcasting House (Manchester) is officially inaugurated as the headquarters of BBC North.

July
 1 July – American science-fiction series The Bionic Woman, starring Lindsay Wagner ITV and reaches number one in the ratings, an almost unheard of event for a science-fiction series.
 17 July-1 August – The BBC provides extensive live coverage of the 1976 Summer Olympic Games. BBC1 broadcasts into the early hours to provide live coverage of the swimming and athletics events with overnight highlights and coverage of other sports shown the following afternoon.
 26 July – Channel Television becomes the final ITV region to begin broadcasting in colour although it wasn't until the following year that all of its local programmes were made in colour.

August
A series of the sitcom The Melting Pot, written by and starring in brownface Spike Milligan with Neil Shand, is recorded for BBC2 but never broadcast.

September
5 September – ITV shows the first episode of Jim Henson's family sketch comedy The Muppet Show, hosted by Kermit the Frog.
6 September
Northern Life replaces Today at Six as Tyne Tees' regional news programme.
George and Mildred, a spin-off from the comedy series Man About the House debuts on ITV.
8 September – BBC1 debuts the Leonard Rossiter-starred comedy series The Fall and Rise of Reginald Perrin.
9 September - Death in the West documentary shown on Thames Television, followed the next day by an injunction preventing it being distributed or shown again.
20 September – BBC2 begins showing the acclaimed Roman Empire-set series I, Claudius, starring Derek Jacobi as the titular Roman Emperor.

October
2 October – The first edition of Saturday morning children’s magazine show Multi-Coloured Swap Shop is broadcast, hosted weekly by Noel Edmonds. 
15 October – The American 1950's-set comedy series Happy Days airs on ITV, in the Grampian and Southern region on Friday 15 October and ITV London on Saturday 16th.  Other areas begin to show the series shortly afterwards. 
22 October – Popular 1960s series The Avengers returns as The New Avengers, its first episode in seven years, with Patrick Macnee returning as John Steed alongside Joanna Lumley and Gareth Hunt.
23 October – Elisabeth Sladen leaves Doctor Who. The events following her departure will not be revealed until a return appearance 30 years later in the revived series.

November
3 November – The network television premiere of the blockbuster 1964 James Bond film Goldfinger on ITV, starring Sean Connery.
11 November – The "Gwen Troake's Banquet" episode of reality television series The Big Time is broadcast on BBC1 which leads in two weeks to the termination of Fanny Cradock's contract with the BBC due to her patronising attitude towards an amateur chef.

December
1 December – Punk group The Sex Pistols cause a storm of controversy and outrage in the UK by swearing well before the 9pm watershed on the regional Thames Television news programme Today, hosted by Bill Grundy who had goaded them into doing so is temporarily sacked. Today is replaced by Thames at Six a year later.
22 December – BBC1 show the Charles Dickens ghost story The Signalman, starring Denholm Elliott.

Unknown
Swindon Viewpoint's experimental phase ends when EMI decides to pull out of funding the service. However, the channel continues after being sold to the public of Swindon for £1.

Debuts

BBC1
 4 January – The Prince and the Pauper (1976)
 5 January – Paddington (1976; 1978–1980)
 6 January – Rentaghost (1976–1984)
 7 January - Marco, 3000 Leagues in Search for Mother
 8 January – When the Boat Comes In (1976–1977; 1981)
 13 January – Nuts in May (1976) (originally in Play for Today)
 21 January – Kizzy (1976)
 9 February – Jumbo Spencer (1976)
 29 February – The Flight of the Heron (1976)
 3 March – Rocky O'Rourke (1976)
 8 March - BBC Evening News (1976-1983, 1984)
 14 April – John Macnab (1976)
 23 April – Starsky & Hutch (1975–1979)
 27 May – Second Verdict (1976)
 31 May – Mike Yarwood in Persons (1976–1981)
 26 August – Sailor (1976)
 4 September – The Duchess of Duke Street (1976–1977)
 5 September – Lorna Doone (1976)
 8 September – The Fall and Rise of Reginald Perrin (1976–1979)
 9 September – Gangsters (1976–1978)
 13 September 
Noah and Nelly in... SkylArk (1976)
 Potter's Picture Palace  (1976–1978)
 2 October – Multi-Coloured Swap Shop (1976–1982)
 10 October – Katy (1976)
 15 October – The Quest (1976)
 10 November – The Canal Children (1976)
 21 November – Little Lord Fauntleroy (1976)
 26 December – The Val Doonican Music Show (1976–1986)
 28 December – James and the Giant Peach (1976)
 29 December – The Phoenix and the Carpet (1976-1977)

BBC2
 7 January – Ripping Yarns (1976–1979)
 21 January – The Glittering Prizes (1976)
 4 February – The Mike Reid Show (1976–1978)
 17 February – One Man and His Dog (1976–present)
 20 February – Open All Hours (BBC2 1976, BBC1 1981–1982, 1985, 2013)
 1 March – Our Mutual Friend (1976)
 19 March – Battle of the Sexes (1976)
 16 July –  Orde Wingate (1976)
 14 August – Masters of Terror (1976)
 20 September – I, Claudius (1976)
 21 September – The Water Margin (1973–1974)
 22 September – Rogue Male (1976)
 24 September – Well Anyway (1976)
 29 September – The Mind Beyond (1976) (Anthology)
 3 December – Brensham People (1976)
 13 December – The Lady of the Camellias (1976)

ITV
 1 January – Clayhanger (1976)
 2 January – The Georgian House (1976)
 4 January – A Place to Hide (1976)
 7 January – Life and Death of Penelope (1976)
 9 January 
 Bouquet of Barbed Wire (1976)
 Yus, My Dear (1976)
 Yes, Honestly (1976–1977)
 11 January – Red Letter Day (1976)
 19 January – Hello Cheeky (1976)
 9 February – Jamie and the Magic Torch (1976-1979)
 15 February – Dominic (1976)
 24 February – Rock Follies (1976–1977)
 17 March – The Molly Wopsies (1976)
 26 March – 4 Idle Hands (1976)
 31 March – Luke's Kingdom (1976)
 1 April – Garnock Way (1976–1979)
 6 April – Plays for Britain (1976)
 9 April – The Fosters (1976–1977)
 28 April 
 The Ghosts of Motley Hall (1976–1978)
 Westway (1976)
 19 May – Dangerous Knowledge (1976)
 30 May – Big Boy Now! (1976–1977)
 6 June – Murder (1976)
 7 June – Bill Brand (1976)
 13 June – Operation Patch (1976)
 21 June – The Feathered Serpent (1976–1978)
 30 June – Killers (1976)
 1 July – The Bionic Woman (1976–1978, 2007)
 3 July 
 Nobody Does It Like Marti (1976)
 The XYY Man (1976–1977)
 18 July – Forget Me Not (1976)
 31 August – Cilla's World of Comedy (1976)
 1 September – Star Maidens (1976)
 2 September – The Howerd Confessions (1976)
 3 September 
 Lucky Feller (1976)
 The Many Wives of Patrick (1976–1978)
 Victorian Scandals (1976)
 5 September – The Muppet Show (1976–1981)
 6 September 
George and Mildred (1976–1979)
Northern Life (1976–1992)
 16 September – The Crezz (1976)
 20 September – The Cedar Tree (1976–1979)
 26 September –  Chorlton and the Wheelies (1976–1979)
 27 September – Nobody's House (1976)
 28 September – Dickens of London (1976)
 14 October – N.U.T.S. (1976)
 15 October – Happy Days (1974–1984)
 16 October – Beasts (1976)
 19 October – The New Avengers (1976–1977)
 15 November – Pauline's Quirkes (1976)
 22 November – Yanks Go Home (1976–1977)
 29 December – The Dame of Sark (1976)
 Unknown – What's on Next? (1976–1978)

Continuing television shows
 signifies that this show has a related event in the Events section above.

1920s
BBC Wimbledon (1927–1939, 1946–2019, 2021–present)

1930s
The Boat Race (1938–1939, 1946–2019)
BBC Cricket (1939, 1946–1999, 2020–2024)

1940s
Come Dancing (1949–1998)

1950s
Panorama (1953–present)
The Good Old Days (1953–1983)
This Is Your Life (1955–2003)
Crackerjack (1955–1984, 2020–present)
Opportunity Knocks (1956–1978)
What the Papers Say (1956–2008)
The Sky at Night (1957–present)
Blue Peter (1958–present)
Grandstand (1958–2007)

1960s
Coronation Street (1960–present)
Songs of Praise (1961–present)
Z-Cars (1962–1978)
Doctor Who (1963–1989, 1996, 2005–present)
Top of the Pops (1964–2006)
Match of the Day (1964–present)
Crossroads (1964–1988, 2001–2003)
Play School (1964–1988)
Call My Bluff (1965–2005)
World of Sport (1965–1985)
Mr & Mrs. (1965–1999) 
Jackanory (1965–1996, 2006)
Sportsnight (1965–1997)
The Money Programme (1966–2010)
Dad's Army (1968–1977)
Magpie (1968–1980)
The Benny Hill Show (1969–1989)
The Big Match (1968–2002)
Nationwide (1969–1983)
Screen Test (1969–1984)

1970s
Play for Today (1970–1984)
The Old Grey Whistle Test (1971–1987)
The Two Ronnies (1971–1987, 1991, 1996, 2005)
Thunderbirds (1972–1980, 1984–1987)
Are You Being Served? (1972–1985)
Rainbow (1972–1992, 1994–1997)
Emmerdale Farm (1972–present)
John Craven's Newsround (1972–present)
Last of the Summer Wine (1973–2010)
Superstars (1973–1985, 2003–2005)
The Tomorrow People (1973–1979, 1992–1995)
Tiswas (1974–1982)
Wish You Were Here...? (1974–2003)
Arena (1975–present)
Jim'll Fix It (1975–1994)
Survivors (1975–1977)
The Good Life (1975–1978)
The Bionic Woman (1976–1978, 2007)
Pop Quest (1975–1978)
Runaround (1975–1981)
Space: 1999 (1975–1977)
Supersonic (1975–1977)
The Sweeney (1975–1978)
Celebrity Squares (1975–1979, 1993–1997, 2014–2015)

Ending this year
Unknown
 Rutland Weekend Television (1975–1976)
 Noah and Nelly in... SkylArk (1976)
 22 January – Love Thy Neighbour (1972–1976)
10 February – Shades of Greene (1975–1976)
26 March – Open All Hours (1976, 1981–1982, 1985, 2013)
7 April – Man About the House (1973–1976)
1 May – Dixon of Dock Green (1955–1976)
31 May – Maya the Honey Bee (1975-1976)
21 June – My Brother's Keeper (1975–1976)
1 December —  Star Maidens (1976)
31 December – Marco, 3000 Leagues in Search for Mother

Births
 19 January – Marsha Thomason, actress
 21 January – Emma Bunton, musician (Spice Girls) and television presenter
 28 January – Lee Ingleby, actor
 3 February – Caroline Bilton, journalist and newsreader
 8 February – Abi Titmuss, television presenter and model
 10 February – Keeley Hawes, actress
 12 February – Jenni Falconer, television presenter
 2 March – Helen Latham, actress
 21 March – Celina Hinchcliffe, television sports presenter
 24 March – Angellica Bell, television presenter
 18 April – Sean Maguire, actor and singer
 27 April – Sally Hawkins, English actress
 29 April – Ana Boulter, television presenter
 14 May – Martine McCutcheon, actress and singer
 2 June – Marek Larwood, actor
 5 June
Rachel Leskovac, actress
Ross Noble, comedian
 13 June – Kym Marsh, actress and singer
 28 June – Lorraine Stanley, actress
 1 July – Kellie Bright, actress 
 7 July – Natasha Collins, actress and model (died 2008)
 8 July – Alex Fletcher, actress
 12 July – Anna Friel, actress
 13 July – Lisa Riley, actress and television presenter
 19 July
Ellie Crisell, journalist and news presenter
Benedict Cumberbatch, actor
 8 August – Laura Kuenssberg, political journalist
 9 August – Rhona Mitra, actress
 6 September – Naomie Harris, actress
 23 September – Rob James-Collier, actor and model
 21 October – Andrew Scott, actor
 23 October – Cat Deeley, television presenter
 1 November – Beth Cordingly, actress
 8 December – Dominic Monaghan, actor
 Unknown – Bryan Kirkwood, television producer

Deaths
 26 April – Sid James, actor and comedian
 19 August – Alastair Sim, actor

See also
 1976 in British music
 1976 in British radio
 1976 in the United Kingdom
 List of British films of 1976

References